The Los Angeles Herald Examiner was a major Los Angeles daily newspaper, published in the afternoon from Monday to Friday and in the morning on Saturdays and Sundays. It was part of the Hearst syndicate. It was formed when the afternoon Herald-Express and the morning Los Angeles Examiner, both of which were published there since the turn of the 20th century, merged in 1962.

For a few years after the merger, the Los Angeles Herald Examiner had the largest afternoon-newspaper circulation in the US. It published its last edition on November 2, 1989.

Early years
William Randolph Hearst founded the Los Angeles Examiner in 1903, in order to assist his campaign for the presidential nomination on the Democratic ticket, complement his San Francisco Examiner, and provide a union-friendly answer to the Los Angeles Times. At its peak in 1960, the Examiner had a circulation of 381,037. It attracted the top newspapermen and women of the day. The Examiner flourished in the 1940s under the leadership of the city editor James H. Richardson, who led his reporters to emphasize crime and Hollywood scandal coverage.

The Los Angeles Herald Examiner was the result of a merger with the Los Angeles Herald-Express in 1962. In turn, the Herald-Express had been the result of a merger between the Los Angeles Evening Express and Evening Herald in 1931. The Herald-Express was also Hearst-owned and excelled in tabloid journalism under City Editor Agness Underwood, a veteran crime reporter for the Los Angeles Record before moving to the Herald-Express first as a reporter and later its city editor. With the merger in 1962, the newspaper became an afternoon-only newspaper.

The Examiner, while founded as a pro-labor newspaper, shifted to a hard-right stance by the 1930s, much like the rest of the Hearst chain. It was pro-law enforcement and was vehemently anti-Japanese during World War II. Its editorials openly praised the mass deportation of Mexicans, including U.S. citizens, in the early 1930s, and was hostile to liberal movements and labor strikes during the Depression. Its coverage of the Zoot Suit Riots in Los Angeles during World War II also was particularly harsh on the Mexican-American community.

Much of its conservative rhetoric was minimized when Richardson retired in 1957. Underwood remained on the staff following the merger in an upper management position, leaving the day-to-day operations to younger editors.

The Hearst Corporation decided to make the new Herald Examiner an afternoon paper, leaving the morning field to the Los Angeles Times (which at the same time had ceased publication of the evening Mirror). However, readers' tastes and demographics were changing. Afternoon newspaper readership was declining as television news became more prominent, while expanding suburbs made it harder to distribute papers during the rush hour. The fact that sports leagues were playing more night games also meant that evening newspapers were no longer able to print full results. Indeed, by the 1950s Hearst's morning papers such as the Examiner had their income siphoned off merely to support the chain's faltering afternoon publications. Following the merger between the Herald-Express and Examiner, readership of the morning Los Angeles Times soared to 757,000 weekday readers and more than 1 million on Sunday. The Herald Examiners circulation dropped from a high of 730,000 in the mid-1960s to 350,000 in 1977. By the time it closed in 1989 its circulation was 238,000.

Strike and closure
On December 15, 1967, Herald Examiner employees began a strike that lasted almost a decade and resulted in at least $15 million in losses. At the time of the labor strike, the paper's circulation was about 721,000 daily and it had 2,000 employees. The strike ended in March 1977, with circulation having dropped to about 350,000 and the number of employees to 700.

Owner William Randolph Hearst, Jr.'s confrontational response prolonged the unrest. He hired a number of strike-breakers to keep the paper going, as well as Pinkerton guards to maintain security, protect the strike-breakers and harass the strikers. Numerous violent incidents took place between pickets and strike-breakers, as well as confrontations between the guards and the Los Angeles Police Department.

Final years 
The paper enjoyed a journalistic and spiritual renaissance beginning in 1978, when Jim Bellows was hired as its editor. "On January 1, Jim Bellows came to Los Angeles as editor of the worst urban daily newspaper in America, the Los Angeles Herald Examiner," read a profile in Esquire magazine, in 1978. Bellows and his successor, Mary Ann Dolan, brought an infusion of new talent, youth and energy to the newsroom. The excitement of rejuvenating a newspaper in Los Angeles with a storied past attracted a stream of young journalists, many with Ivy League credentials. The paper's scrappy, no-holds-barred, often unconventional coverage repeatedly challenged the dominant Los Angeles Times on stories about City Hall, local politics, the Los Angeles Police Department, the arts and sports, and its coverage was recognized repeatedly for its excellence by the Los Angeles Press Club. The paper was also slightly schizophrenic: its entertainment section was hip, its sports section was blue-collar and its news hole straddled the tabloid and kick-ass journalism genres. However, as an after-effect of the 10-year long strike, advertising and circulation continued to decline.

The paper switched back to a morning publication in 1982, 20 years after the merger; this did little to improve sagging revenue and readership. Furthermore, having two editions led to higher production costs. The afternoon edition was dropped during 1989.

In 1989, the Hearst Corporation attempted to sell the moribund newspaper, but found no suitable buyers (News Corporation intended to buy the paper and turn it into a tabloid, but backed out). This led to the company's shutting down the newspaper.

On November 2, 1989, the paper printed its last edition, with a banner head saying "SO LONG, L.A.!" One factor behind the shutdown was increased pressure from the competing Los Angeles Times, whose circulation was, at the time of the Herald Examiner'''s shutdown, about four times larger.

Editorial writer Joel Bellman recalled that by then the newspaper's

once-splendid 1913 Julia Morgan-inspired Mission Revival building had gone to seed, the ground-floor arched windows long since covered over as a result of vandalism . . . . Its beautiful lobby and graceful staircase to the second-floor newsroom were virtually all that was left of the original interior; the rest looked like a cheap 1950s-era retrofit.

Notable cases
Black Dahlia coverageThis specific section relates to the period when the newspaper was known as the Los Angeles ExaminerThe Examiner was the first newspaper to break the story of the 1947 dismemberment murder of 22-year-old Elizabeth Short, who was ultimately dubbed the Black Dahlia by Los Angeles Herald-Express crime reporter Bevo Means.Examiner news reporter Will Fowler was on another assignment with photographer Felix Paegel on January 15, 1947, when they heard a radio call of a mutilated female body found in a vacant lot on Norton Avenue in the Leimert Park area of Los Angeles. Fowler and Paegel arrived before police and observed the female body. Fowler claimed in his autobiography that he knelt down to close the victim's eyes before Paegel began shooting photographs. City editor Richardson in his own autobiography had another, more mundane version of the Examiner obtaining the story. He said that reporter Bill Zelinsky called the city desk from Los Angeles Police headquarters to report the discovery of the body and a reporter and photographer were dispatched to the lot where a crowd of newsmen was already assembled.

Whatever the facts were, the morning Examiner scooped the other Los Angeles newspapers by publishing an extra edition two hours before any of the afternoon newspapers hit the streets.

By the late afternoon of January 15, an autopsy on the female victim was completed by the Los Angeles County Coroner's Office. The victim's fingerprints were scheduled to be airmailed to the FBI fingerprint identification division in Washington, D.C. Examiner Assistant Managing Editor Warden Woolard suggested to Los Angeles police Capt. Jack Donahoe, who was chief of the department's homicide division, that the victim's fingerprints be transmitted to the FBI by using the Examiners new soundphoto machine. During the early morning hours of January 16, the International News Photo wire service received the prints via photo transmission from the Examiner. Soon afterward, the FBI identified the victim as Elizabeth Short.

In the early afternoon of January 16 an Examiner extra hit the streets, again beating the competition. The Examiner identified Short and provided details of her life growing up in Massachusetts, and details of her adult life in Santa Barbara and later in Los Angeles. The Examiner noted that Short had lived in Los Angeles for a period of time before moving to various other cities in the pursuit of jobs and men. She returned to Los Angeles in 1946 and lived in hotels and rooming houses while visiting a man she had met while living in Florida.

Following Short's identification, reporters from the Los Angeles Examiner contacted her mother, Phoebe Short, and told her that her daughter had won a beauty contest. Only after prying as much personal information as they could from Phoebe did the reporters tell her that her daughter had been murdered. The newspaper offered to pay her air fare and accommodations if she would travel to Los Angeles to help with the police investigation. That was yet another ploy, since the newspaper kept her away from police and other reporters to protect its scoop.

Each day the Examiner came up with more details of Short's murder, and painted her as a lovelorn woman searching for a husband. The Los Angeles Daily News was getting hammered daily by the Examiner. The newspaper's editors were so desperate for fresh stories that they sent rookie reporter Roy Ringer to the Examiners offices on Broadway. Ringer was new and unknown to Examiner newsmen. He walked into the Examiners composing room from off the street and lifted the Black Dahlia story proofs off the spikes and walked out. The Daily News city desk then rewrote the Examiner’s stories. After three days of stealing Examiner copy, Ringer walked into the composing room on the fourth day for a fresh batch of Black Dahlia stories. As he was about to grab a handful of proofs from the spike, someone from behind grabbed his shoulder. Behind Ringer was Examiner city editor James Richardson. "Nice try", said Richardson, as he sent Ringer back to the Daily News empty-handed.

At one point an anonymous tip led Examiner reporters to the Greyhound bus station in downtown Los Angeles, where a steamer trunk owned by Short was discovered. Inside were letters, photographs and clothing belonging to the victim. The Examiner obtained the contents and led coverage of Short's life leading up to her death based on her own personal records and in her own voice. In another instance, more photos, newspaper clippings and letters were anonymously mailed to the Examiner. Richardson often said in subsequent interviews about his years at the Examiner that he believed the letters were from Short's killer.

The Black Dahlia case was never solved, but for three months it led most of the Los Angeles newspaper's front pages until other sensational homicides replaced it.

Jailing of William Farr
During the 1970 Los Angeles murder trial of Charles Manson and his followers, who were charged with the 1969 murders of actress Sharon Tate and six others, Herald Examiner reporter William Farr reported in an article that Manson had planned to murder Elizabeth Taylor and Frank Sinatra.

Farr was summoned by judge Charles Older to divulge his sources for the article. Farr refused. But at that time, Farr had already left the Herald Examiner to work for the Los Angeles County District Attorney's Office and later for the Los Angeles Times. Farr cited the California reporters shield law that protected him from revealing his sources, but Older ruled that since Farr was no longer a journalist he was required to hand over his notes.

Farr continued to refuse to reveal his sources and was jailed for 48 days from 1972 to January 11, 1973 on a contempt of court citation. Although he was released from custody by order of U.S. Supreme Court Justice William O. Douglas while the decision was on appeal, his case dragged through the courts for several years. The courts, however, recognized that a journalist could spend the rest of his life in jail if he refuses to divulge his sources on moral principle. In 1974, a California State Court of Appeal determined in In re Farr (36 C.A. 3d 577, 1974) that a procedure had to be adopted that allowed the courts to hold a hearing to consider a contempt of court citation involving the shield law. The first issue was whether a reporter was refusing to reveal sources by invoking the shield on "moral principle". The second consideration by the court was whether incarcerating the reporter would likely induce him or her to reveal the sources. In 1976, the state appellate court finally set aside the contempt citation.

The Farr case in effect strengthened the California shield law and served as a precedent in future shield law cases involving journalists.

Building
The Los Angeles Herald Examiner Building is at the southwest corner of Broadway and 11th Streets in southern Downtown Los Angeles. Hearst paid $1 million in 1913 for the parcel, which was part of railroad magnate Henry Huntington's land holdings.  The building was designed in the Mission Revival and Spanish Colonial Revival styles, largely by San Francisco architect Julia Morgan, then associated with Los Angeles architects J. Martyn Haenke and William J. Dodd, whose contributions have not yet been determined by scholars. It was completed in 1914, and is a Los Angeles Historic-Cultural Monument.

After the newspaper closed in 1989, the building remained in use as a popular filming location for 26 years, with its ornate, period appropriate lobby to 15 standing sets ranging from a modern police station, a courtroom, a hospital, to an industrial basement perfect for horror. It was once the second-most-filmed location in Los Angeles having hosted over 1,250 individual productions as of 2013, ranging from Hollywood blockbusters such as Short Cuts (1993), The Usual Suspects (1995), the Academy Award winner, Dreamgirls (2006), to its last production, the indie film Fixed (2017), produced by longtime property manager Bryan Erwin. It was also featured in television series as varied as Murder, She Wrote, Brooklyn Nine-Nine, and It's Always Sunny in Philadelphia. The property hosted its last production in July 2015. Vincent, Roger  (10 September 2021), Historic Herald Examiner Building reopens as a downtown L.A. neighborhood revives Los Angeles Times.

Georgetown Co., a New York real estate developer, obtained control of the site in 2015. Plans for an $80-million renovation by architecture firm Gensler included restaurants and shops on the ground floor and offices in the remaining space. Walter and Margarita Manzke were planning a restaurant there. In 2019, Arizona State University announced plans to locate its Los Angeles campus in the building.

Earlier publication

Los Angeles Express

The Los Angeles Express was Los Angeles's oldest newspaper published under its original name until it merged with the Herald. It was established on March 27, 1871.

Los Angeles Herald

Established in 1873, the Los Angeles Herald or the Evening Herald represented the largely Democratic views of the city and focused primarily on issues local to Los Angeles and Southern California. The Los Angeles Daily Herald was first published on October 2, 1873, by Charles A. Storke. It was the first newspaper in Southern California to use the innovative steam press; the newspaper's offices at 125 South Broadway were popular with the public because large windows on the ground floor allowed passersby to see the presses in motion. In 1922, the Herald officially joined the Hearst News empire.

Los Angeles Herald-Express

In 1931, Hearst merged the Los Angeles Daily Herald with the Los Angeles Evening Express to form the Los Angeles Evening Herald and Express, which was then the largest circulating evening newspaper west of the Mississippi.

Notable staff members
Writers and editors
 James Bacon, entertainment reporter and author
 Jim Bellows, editor, later developed Entertainment Tonight Winfred Blevins, entertainment editor, author of 40 books and screenplays
 Alex Ben Block, reporter, later editor of The Hollywood Reporter Denis Boyles, entertainment writer, 1979-1981
 Jim Burns, travel editor, later newspaper adviser for "The Occidental Weekly"
 Harrison Carroll, entertainment writer 1925–1969
 Ruben Castaneda, reporter, author of S Street Rising 
 Jim Cramer, author and host of CNBC's "Mad Money" 
 Francis L. Dale, final publisher of Herald Examiner, also part-owner of Cincinnati Reds
 Mel Durslag, sports columnist, also columnist for TV Guide Donald Forst, editor, also editor of Newsday and The Village Voice John Tracy Gaffey, first Herald editor, 1893; City Council member who helped develop the Port of Los Angeles
 Carl Greenberg, reporter, later political editor of the Los Angeles Times Harold A. Henry, later a community journalist and a Los Angeles City Council member
 L. D. Hotchkiss, editor
 Bob Hunter, baseball writer, 1943–1977
 David Israel, columnist, later a television writer and producer
 Andrew Jaffe, business editor, later executive with AdweekJames Kinsella, president and founding general manager of MSNBC
Christopher Knight, art critic
 Doug Krikorian, sports columnist
 Rian Malan, reporter from South Africa, later author of the book My Traitor's Heart  
 Gardner McKay, literary critic 1977–1982, actor
 Joe Morgenstern, film critic, later won a Pulitzer Prize with The Wall Street Journal Jim Murray, sports columnist, later won a Pulitzer Prize with the Los Angeles Times Scot J. Paltrow, financial journalist
 Rip Rense, critic and author
 John Schwada, City Hall reporter, later with the Los Angeles Times & Fox 11 News
 Mark Schwed, TV critic
 Al Stump, sportswriter, later a biographer of Ty Cobb
 Ken Tucker, rock critic
 Agness Underwood, reporter and then one of the first female city editors of a major metropolitan daily, at the predecessor Herald-Express; later an editor at the Herald Examiner
 Nicole Yorkin, reporter, later television writer, producer
 Gene Youngblood, critic

Photographers
 Chris Gulker
 Sam Sansone

Cartoonists
 Karl Hubenthal
 Bill Schorr

See alsoLos Angeles Examiner Los Angeles Express Los Angeles HeraldLos Angeles Herald-Express''

References

Sources
 Will Fowler; Reporters: Memoirs of a Young Newspaperman; Roundtable Publishing;  (hardback, 1991)
 James Richardson;  For the Life of Me: Memoirs of a City Editor ; G.P. Putnam's Sons; (hardback, 1954)
 Rob Leicester Wagner; Red Ink White Lies: The Rise and Fall of Los Angeles Newspapers 1920-1962; ; Dragonflyer Press; (paperback, 2000)
 Wayne Overbeck; Major Principles of Media Law; Wadsworth Publishing Co Inc.;  (hardback, 2006)
 C T White; Website: William J. Dodd 1861-1930 ~American Architect and Designer~ Sources on History of LA Herald Examiner: LA Times and LA Public Library

Herald Examiner
Defunct daily newspapers
Defunct newspapers published in California
Publications disestablished in 1989
History of Los Angeles
Buildings and structures in Los Angeles
Commercial buildings completed in 1914
Los Angeles Historic-Cultural Monuments
Mission Revival architecture in California
Spanish Colonial Revival architecture in California
Publications established in 1903
Publications established in 1962
Hearst Communications publications
1903 establishments in California
1989 disestablishments in California